Karl Gunnar David Lidholm (born 28 May 1982), formerly known as David Johansson, is a Swedish football defender who mainly played for Hammarby IF in Stockholm. He is currently playing for Skövde AIK.

References

External links 
 

1982 births
Living people
Swedish footballers
Allsvenskan players
Ettan Fotboll players
Hammarby Talang FF players
Hammarby Fotboll players
Skövde AIK players
Association football defenders
People from Skövde Municipality
Sportspeople from Västra Götaland County